Hydroporus pubescens is a species of water beetle native to the Palearctic (including Europe) and the Near East. In Europe, it is only found in Albania, Austria, the Balearic Islands, Belgium, Bosnia and Herzegovina, Bulgaria, the Channel Islands, Corsica, Crete, Croatia, Cyprus, the Czech Republic, mainland Denmark, the Dodecanese, Estonia, European Turkey, the Faroe Islands, Finland, mainland France, Germany, Great Britain including the Isle of Man, mainland Greece, the Republic of Ireland, mainland Italy, Kaliningrad, Latvia,  Luxembourg, Northern Ireland, North Macedonia, mainland Norway, Poland, mainland Portugal, Russia, Sardinia, Sicily, Slovakia, Slovenia, mainland Spain, Sweden, Switzerland, the Netherlands, Ukraine and Yugoslavia.

References

Dytiscidae
Beetles of Europe
Beetles described in 1808